The Men's Madison is one of the 10 men's events at the 2010 UCI Track Cycling World Championships, held in Ballerup, Denmark.

18 teams, each of two riders participated in the contest. The Final was held on 27 March.

Results

References

Results

Men's madison
UCI Track Cycling World Championships – Men's madison